Esbjerg RK is a Danish rugby club in Esbjerg. Though they are a standalone club, they often combine with other teams to play matches due to lack of player numbers.

References

External links
Esbjerg RK
Esbjerg RK on Facebook
Photo of kit

Danish rugby union teams
Esbjerg